Tiago Fernandes Cavalcanti, (born 5 September 1984) is a Brazilian professional footballer who plays for ASA.

Career
Born in Mirassol, Tiago Cavalcanti began his football career in Brazil. He played for Iraty Sport Club and Clube Atlético Mineiro before being scouted by Christoph Daum and signing a five-year contract with 2. Bundesliga side 1. FC Köln in January 2007.

Tiago Cavalcanti scored 10 goals in the 2013 Campeonato Brasileiro Série C for Sampaio Corrêa Futebol Clube before moving to Série B side Clube Atlético Bragantino in December 2013.

References

External links

1984 births
Living people
Brazilian footballers
Shensa players
Ituano FC players
Iraty Sport Club players
Esporte Clube Juventude players
Mirassol Futebol Clube players
Coritiba Foot Ball Club players
Clube Atlético Mineiro players
Joinville Esporte Clube players
1. FC Köln players
Campinense Clube players
América Futebol Clube (RN) players
Associação Chapecoense de Futebol players
Itumbiara Esporte Clube players
Sampaio Corrêa Futebol Clube players
Clube Atlético Bragantino players
Agremiação Sportiva Arapiraquense players
Campeonato Brasileiro Série B players
Brazilian people of Italian descent
Brazilian expatriate footballers
Expatriate footballers in Germany
Expatriate footballers in Iran
Expatriate footballers in Morocco
Brazilian expatriate sportspeople in Germany
Brazilian expatriate sportspeople in Iran
Brazilian expatriate sportspeople in Morocco
Association football forwards